Hamilton County (county code HM) is a county located in the U.S. state of Kansas. As of the 2020 census, the county population was 2,518. Its county seat and most populous city is Syracuse. The county was founded in 1873 and named for Alexander Hamilton.

Geography

Major highways
 U.S. Highway 50
 U.S. Highway 400
 K-27

Adjacent counties
 Greeley County (north)
 Wichita County (northeast/Central Time border)
 Kearny County (east/Central Time border)
 Stanton County (south/Central Time border)
 Prowers County, Colorado (west)

Demographics

As of the 2000 census, there were 2,670 people, 1,054 households, and 715 families residing in the county.  The population density was 3 people per square mile (1/km2).  There were 1,211 housing units at an average density of 1 per square mile (0/km2).  The racial makeup of the county was 81.65% White, 0.56% Asian, 0.49% Black or African American, 0.49% Native American, 15.13% from other races, and 1.69% from two or more races. Hispanic or Latino of any race were 20.60% of the population.

There were 1,054 households, out of which 33.90% had children under the age of 18 living with them, 56.90% were married couples living together, 7.60% had a female householder with no husband present, and 32.10% were non-families. 29.40% of all households were made up of individuals, and 15.80% had someone living alone who was 65 years of age or older.  The average household size was 2.49 and the average family size was 3.09.

In the county, the population was spread out, with 28.40% under the age of 18, 7.20% from 18 to 24, 25.30% from 25 to 44, 20.90% from 45 to 64, and 18.40% who were 65 years of age or older.  The median age was 38 years. For every 100 females there were 97.60 males.  For every 100 females age 18 and over, there were 92.60 males.

The median income for a household in the county was $32,033, and the median income for a family was $38,550. Males had a median income of $26,701 versus $21,000 for females. The per capita income for the county was $16,484.  About 10.90% of families and 15.70% of the population were below the poverty line, including 21.50% of those under age 18 and 9.40% of those age 65 or over.

Government

Hamilton County is often carried by Republican Candidates. The last time a Democratic candidate has carried Hamilton County was in 1976 by Jimmy Carter. As like many counties that border it, Republicans have been increasing their influence in the county's presidential elections, when Donald J. Trump in 2016 won by a margin of approximately 70%, as Hillary Clinton only managed to get 13% of the county's vote.

Presidential elections

Laws
Although the Kansas Constitution was amended in 1986 to allow the sale of alcoholic liquor by the individual drink with the approval of voters, Hamilton County has remained a prohibition, or "dry", county.

Education

Unified school districts
 Syracuse USD 494

Communities

Cities
 Coolidge
 Syracuse

Unincorporated community
 Kendall

Townships
Hamilton County is divided into eight townships.  None of the cities within the county are considered governmentally independent, and all figures for the townships include those of the cities.  In the following table, the population center is the largest city (or cities) included in that township's population total, if it is of a significant size.

Gallery

See also

References

Further reading

External links

County
 Hamilton County - Official
 Hamilton County - Directory of Public Officials
Maps
 Hamilton County Maps: Current, Historic, KDOT
 Kansas Highway Maps: Current, Historic, KDOT
 Kansas Railroad Maps: Current, 1996, 1915, KDOT and Kansas Historical Society

 
Kansas counties
1873 establishments in Kansas
Populated places established in 1873